Tel Aviv University (TAU; , Universitat Tel Aviv) is a public research university in Tel Aviv, Israel. With over 30,000 students, it is the largest university in the country. Located in northwest Tel Aviv, the university is the center of teaching and research of the city, comprising 9 faculties, 17 teaching hospitals, 18 performing arts centers, 27 schools, 106 departments, 340 research centers, and 400 laboratories.

Tel Aviv University originated in 1956 when three education units merged to form the university. The original 170-acre campus was expanded and now makes up 220 acres (89 hectares) in Tel Aviv's Ramat Aviv neighborhood.

History
TAU's origins date back to 1956, when three research institutes: the Tel Aviv School of Law and Economics (established in 1935), the Institute of Natural Sciences (established in 1931), and the Academic Institute of Jewish Studies (established in 1954) – joined to form Tel Aviv University. Initially operated by the Tel Aviv municipality, the university was granted autonomy in 1963, and George S. Wise was its first president, from that year until 1971. Its succeeding Presidents have been Yuval Ne'eman from 1971 to 1977, Haim Ben-Shahar from 1977 to 1983, Moshe Many from 1983 to 1991, Yoram Dinstein from 1991 to 1999, Itamar Rabinovich from 1999 to 2006, Zvi Galil from 2006 to 2009, Joseph Klafter from 2009 to 2019, and Ariel Porat since 2019.

The university also maintains academic supervision over the Center for Technological Design in Holon, the New Academic College of Tel Aviv-Yafo, and the Afeka College of Engineering in Tel Aviv. The Wise Observatory is located in Mitzpe Ramon in the Negev desert.

Academic units

Faculties
Katz Faculty of the Arts
Fleischman Faculty of Engineering
Sackler Faculty of Exact Sciences
Entin Faculty of Humanities
Buchmann Faculty of Law
Wise Faculty of Life Sciences
Sackler Faculty of Medicine
Gordon Faculty of Social Sciences
Boris Mints Institute
Coller School of Management

Independent schools 
Porter School of Environmental Studies
Buchmann-Mehta School of Music
David Azrieli School of Architecture
Goldschleger School of Dental Medicine
Miller School of Education
Shapell School of Social Work
TAU International (formerly the School for Overseas Students)
Sagol School of Neuroscience

Institutes and centers
Tel Aviv University has over 130 research institutes and centers.

The Lowy International School– English-taught programs
The Lowy International School (formerly known as TAU International) affords thousands of students from across the globe the opportunity to study at Tel Aviv University. All Lowy International School programs are conducted in English.

Programs include Semester or Year Abroad, Degree Programs, and Specialized Programs, such as the International LL.M at the Faculty of Law. Students in the Undergraduate or Semester Abroad Programs are given the option of housing at the Einstein Dorms, just outside the university.

Undergraduate programs:
B.S. in Electrical and Electronics Engineering via the International Engineering School
International B.A. degree in Liberal Arts and Humanities

Graduate programs:
 
M.A. in Political Science (Leadership, Communications and Elections)
M.A. in Security and Diplomacy 
M.A in Middle Eastern Studies
Archaeology and History of the Land of the Bible
TESOL – Teaching English to Speakers of Other Languages
International Program in Conflict Resolution and Mediation
M.A. in Social Work with specialization in Crisis and Trauma Studies
M.P.H. in Emergency and Disaster Management
M.A. in Environmental Studies
Sofaer International MBA
Kellogg Recanati MBA
M.A. in Migration Studies
International LL.M.

Medical school:

Within the Sackler Faculty of Medicine, there is a four year, English speaking Doctor of Medicine program which prepares students from North America for residencies in the United States and Canada. The program has a track record of excellent residency matches which far exceeds most international medical school.

In May 2007, New York University and Tel Aviv University approved a plan to establish an NYU Study Abroad Campus in Israel based at Tel Aviv University.

Rankings

The Center for World University Rankings ranked Tel Aviv University 81st in the world and third in Israel in its 2016 CWUR World University Rankings. They have also ranked it as 56 in 2012.

The Times Higher Education World University Rankings for 2019 placed Tel Aviv University at 189th in the world. The ratings reflect an overall measure of esteem that combines data on the institutions' reputation for research and teaching.

In 2013 QS World University Rankings ranked Tel Aviv University 196th in the world, making it the second-highest ranked university in Israel. Its subject rankings were: 202nd in Arts and Humanities, 295th in Engineering and Technology, 193rd in Life Sciences and Medicine, 208th in Natural Science, and 240th in Social Sciences and Management.

In 2016 QS World University Rankings ranked Tel Aviv University 22nd in the world for citations per faculty, which is the indicator that measures a university's research impact. This makes Tel Aviv University the leading university in Israel in terms of research.

In 2015 the Academic Ranking of World Universities gave Tel Aviv University the following subject rankings: 20th in Computer Science, 51–75 in Mathematics, 76–100 in Physics and 76-100 Economics/Business. In 2016 it was ranked as 51–75 in Engineering.

From the year 2007 until 2018, Tel Aviv university ranks as 35th in the world in Computer Science according to CSRankings, the same rank as Harvard and the second-highest ranked in Israel.

As of 2021, it is ranked as the 191st best university in the world by THE World University Rankings, 230th by the QS World University Rankings  and in the 151-200th bracket by the Shanghai Rankings

In 2022, PitchBook Data ranked Tel Aviv University 7th in the world in terms of number of alumni who have founded venture capital backed companies, the highest out of any University outside the United States.

Relations with other universities

Tel Aviv University offers special programs of Jewish studies to teachers and students from the United States, France, Brazil, Argentina and Mexico. The programs are in English.

The Tel Aviv University Faculty of Law has exchange agreements with 36 overseas universities, including: University of Virginia, Cornell University, Boston University, UCLA, Bucerius (Germany), EBS (Germany), McGill (Canada), Osgoode Hall (Canada), Ottawa (Canada), Queens University (Queens), Toronto (Canada), Bergen (Norway), STL (China), KoGuan (China), Tsinghua (China), Jindal Global (India), University of Hong Kong, Singapore Management University, Stockholm University (Sweden), Monash (Australia), Sydney (Australia), Sciences Po (France), Seoul (South Korea), Lucern (Switzerland), Buenos Aires (Argentina), Bocconi (Italy)  and Madrid (Spain).

The Coller School of Management has exchange agreements with over 100 overseas universities. The Coller Exchange Program is open to MBA/MSc/MA students and qualified professionals. The school offers a wide variety of courses for its visiting students in strategy, entrepreneurship, finance-accounting, marketing, organizational behavior, decisions and operations research, technology and information systems. The program also offers courses from other TAU schools on Israeli Culture, History, Economics and more.

In 2013, Tel Aviv University and Ruppin Academic Center jointly created a study center at the Mediterranean Sea, where students will undertake advanced studies of issues impacting the coastal environment and its resources.

International cooperation
In Germany, Tel Aviv University cooperates with the Goethe-University in Frankfurt/Main. Both cities are linked by a long-lasting partnership agreement.

Publications
Tel Aviv (journal), peer-reviewed international journal of archaeology in the Levant and the history and culture of Near Eastern civilizations, with a focus on biblical and protohistoric periods and also dealing with the classical and prehistoric periods

Notable people

Faculty

Notable faculty members (past and present) include:
Yakir Aharonov, physicist
Noga Alon, mathematician
Yitzhak Arad, historian
Karen Avraham, geneticist 
Shlomo Ben-Ami, historian, former Minister of Foreign Affairs
Yoav Benjamini, statistician
Ziva Ben-Porat, literary theorist, writer, and editor
Joseph Bernstein, mathematician
Silvia Blumenfeld, curator of the fungi collection
Athalya Brenner, feminist Biblical scholar
Daniel Chamovitz, biologist
Guy Deutscher, physicist
Yoram Dinstein, international law professor emeritus and former president of Tel Aviv University
Uzi Even, chemist and political activist for LGBT rights
Margalit Finkelberg, historian and linguist
Israel Finkelstein, archaeologist
Yisrael Friedman, historian
Raphael E. Freundlich, Biblical studies and Latin
Ehud Gazit, nanotechnologist, chief scientist - ministry of Science
David Ginzburg, mathematician
Bob Griffin (born 1980), basketball player and English Literature professor
Daphna Hacker, lawyer
Sylvie Honigman, senior lecturer in ancient history
Benjamin Isaac, historian
Joshua Jortner, physical chemist
Shoshana Kamin, mathematician
Aryeh Kasher, historian
Asa Kasher, philosopher and authority on Ethics, author of IDF's Code of Conduct
David S. Katz, historian
Joseph Klafter, chemical physics, the eighth president of Tel Aviv University
Shaul Ladany, industrial engineering
Fred Landman, semanticist
Zvi Laron, pediatric endocrinologist
Orna Lin, lawyer
Raphael Mahler, historian
Yossi Matias, Computer Scientist
Vitali Milman, mathematician
Moshé Mizrahi, Oscar-winning film director
Baruch Modan, oncologist
Yuval Ne'eman (1925–2006), physicist, former minister of Science and Technology
Abraham Nitzan, chemical physicist.
Kennedy Otieno, criminologist
Ariel Porat, legal scholar and president of Tel Aviv University
Itamar Rabinovich, former Israeli ambassador to the United States and former president of Tel Aviv University
Aviad Raz, sociologist
Tanya Reinhart (1943–2007), linguist
Amnon Rubinstein, former Dean of Law, also former Education minister
Ariel Rubinstein, economist
Joseph Sadan, emeritus professor, Department of Arabic and Islamic Studies
Pnina Salzman, pianist and piano pedagogue
Shlomo Sand, historian
Leon Schidlowsky, composer
Anita Shapira, historian
Micha Sharir, mathematician
Edna Shavit, drama
Margot Shiner, gastroenterologist
Joshua Sobol, playwright, writer, and director
David Soudry, mathematician
Carlo Strenger psychologist, philosopher
Leonard Susskind, physicist
Boris Tsirelson, mathematician
Jacob Turkel, Israeli Supreme Court Justice
Lev Vaidman, physicist
Avi Weinroth, lawyer
Paul Wexler, linguist
George S. Wise, first president of the university (1963–1971)
Moshe Wolman, neuropathologist
Amotz Zahavi, biologist
Moshe Zviran, Dean of the Coller School of Management

Alumni

Carmela Abraham, neuroscientist and Alzheimer's disease researcher
Zvi Arad (1942–2018), mathematician, acting president of Bar-Ilan University, president of Netanya Academic College
Dan Ariely, author and academic
Fouad Awad, theatre director
Lucy Ayoub, television host
Alon Bar, award-winning filmmaker
Daphne Barak Erez, current Supreme Court of Israel justice
Mohammad Barakeh, Knesset member and leader of Hadash
Rebecka Belldegrun (born 1950), ophthalmologist and businesswoman
Shlomo Ben-Ami, historian, former Minister of Foreign Affairs (Labor)
Yochai Benkler, co-director of the Berkman Center, Harvard Law School
Aluf Benn, editor-in-chief of Haaretz
Avishay Braverman (born 1948), Knesset member and president of the Ben-Gurion University of the Negev
Shimshon Brokman (born 1957), Olympic sailor
Moran Cerf (born 1977), neuroscientist, professor at the Kellogg School of Management at Northwestern University
Nili Cohen (born 1947), professor and legal expert
Ran Cohen, former Minister of Housing (Meretz)
Orna Donath (born 1976), academic and activist
Arie Eldad, former Knesset member (National Union (Israel))
Israel Eliashiv, former Israeli Ambassador to Singapore
Nancy Ezer, author and professor of Hebrew at UCLA
Yael S. Feldman, Abraham I. Katsh Professor of Hebrew Culture and Education and professor of Hebrew and Judaic studies at New York University
Ari Folman, filmmaker (Director of Waltz with Bashir) 
Tal Friedman, comedian, actor, and musician
Amir Gal-Or, founder of the Infinity Group
Zvi Galil (born 1947), computer scientist, mathematician, and president of Tel Aviv University
Benny Gantz, Chief of General Staff of the Israel Defense Forces.
Lior Geller, Academy Award and Emmy Award nominated filmmaker and Guinness World Record holder
Dan Gillerman, former Israeli Ambassador to the UN, and vice-president of the 60th UN General Assembly
Bob Griffin (born 1950), basketball player and English Literature professor
Tamar Halperin, harpsichordist, pianist and musicologist
Tzachi Hanegbi, member of Knesset, former minister of Internal Security (Likud and Kadima)
Rafael Harpaz, Israeli Ambassador to the Philippines
Michael Harris, academic
Avi Hasson, current Chief Scientist of the Ministry of Economy
Zvi Heifetz, former Israeli Ambassador to the United Kingdom
Ron Huldai, current mayor of Tel Aviv
Benjamin Isaac, historian
Moshe Kam, 49th President of IEEE and Dean of the Newark College of Engineering
Moshe Kaplinsky, Deputy Chief of the IDF General Staff
Efraim Karsh, historian
Rita Katz, terrorism analyst
Etgar Keret, writer
Dov Khenin, political scientist and Knesset member Hadash
Joseph Klafter, chemical physics professor, the eighth president of Tel Aviv University
Yosef Lapid, former Israeli vice premier, Minister of Justice and founder of the Shinui party
Amos Lapidot (1934–2019), fighter pilot, 10th commander of the Israeli Air Force, and president of Technion – Israel Institute of Technology
Peretz Lavie (born 1949), expert in the psychophysiology of sleep and sleep disorders, 16th president of the Technion - Israel Institute of Technology, Dean of the Rappaport Faculty of Medicine
Keren Leibovitch, champion Paralympic swimmer
Hanoch Levin (1943–99), dramatist, theater director, author and poet
Amnon Lipkin-Shahak, former Israeli Chief of Staff and Minister of Tourism and Transportation
Yossi Matias, computer scientist and Google executive
Moni Moshonov, actor and comedian
Yitzhak Mordechai, former Israeli Minister of Defense and Transportation
Natasha Mozgovaya, journalist
Abraham Nitzan, chemical physicist
Sassona Norton, sculptor 
Daniella Ohad Smith, design historian
Yitzhak Orpaz-Auerbach, author
 Mazi Melesa Pilip, Ethiopian-born American politician
Ophir Pines-Paz, former Interior Minister (Labor)
Ariel Porat (born 1956), president of Tel Aviv University 
Gideon Raff, director and screenwriter, creator of the award-winning Israeli TV series Prisoners of War, adapted into Homeland
Haim Ramon, former Minister of Health and Justice (Labor and Kadima)
Ilan Ramon (1954–2003), first Israeli astronaut
Yoram Raved, attorney
Daniel Reisner, former Head of the International Law Branch of the IDF Legal Division
Elie Rekhess, historian of the Israeli–Palestinian conflict and faculty of Northwestern University
Gideon Sa'ar, Knesset member and Minister of Interior Affairs (Likud) 
Hanoch Senderowitz (born 1963), Israeli chemist
Hamutal Shabtai, novelist 
Ron Shachar, professor and researcher
Simon Shaheen, musician
Silvan Shalom, former minister of Finance and Foreign Affairs (Likud)
Ayelet Shaked, Israel's former Minister of Justice and current Minister of Interior (Yamina)
Adi Shamir, cryptographer, co-inventor of the RSA cryptosystem
Ariel Sharon (1928–2014), Prime Minister of Israel (Likud and Kadima)
Lou Silver, basketball player
Daniel Sivan, professor
Uri Sivan, physicist, professor, and president of the Technion – Israel Institute of Technology
Nahum Sonenberg, biochemist at McGill University
Michael Wolffsohn, author and former professor for contemporary history at the Bundeswehr University Munich 
Yuval Tal, founder of Payoneer
Gadi Taub, historian, author, screenwriter, and political commentator
Hagit Messer Yaron (born 1953), electrical engineer, businesswoman, and president of Open University of Israel
Natan Yonatan (1923–2004), poet
Poju Zabludowicz, billionaire, philanthropist, and owner of Tamares Group
Bat-Sheva Zeisler, singer and actress
Abdel Rahman Zuabi, former Supreme Court of Israel justice
Ghil'ad Zuckermann, linguist

Sackler Family

Tel Aviv University has long held significant ties to the Sackler family as evidenced by several schools and many endowed chairs being in their honor. As more has become known of the role of members of the Sackler family in the global opioid crisis, many including the Israeli Medical Association have called for the removal of the Sackler name from the Faculty of Medicine. As of November 2021, no members of the Sackler family served on the university's board of governors.

See also
Beth Hatefutsoth
List of universities in Israel
Tel Aviv International Student Film Festival

References

External links

 – Introduction, and History.
Tel Aviv University International
American Friends of Tel Aviv University

 
Universities in Israel
1956 establishments in Israel
Universities and colleges in Tel Aviv
Film schools in Israel
Law schools in Israel
Research institutes in Israel
Educational institutions established in 1956